Platydracus is a genus of rove beetles in the family Staphylinidae. There are more than 280 described species in Platydracus.

The species of Platydracus were formerly classified in the genus Staphylinus.

See also
 List of Platydracus species

References

Further reading

External links

 

Staphylininae